Homeboy(s), Home Boy, or Homeboyz may refer to:

Film and television 
 Homeboy (TV show), a Philippine TV talk show
 Homeboy (film), a 1988 film starring Mickey Rourke
 Homeboys of Oz, a fictional gang in the TV series Oz
 Sold (TV series), a British television series, produced under the working title Homeboys

Literature 
 Homeboyz (novel), a novel by Alan Lawrence Sitomer
Home Boy, a novel by H. M. Naqvi
 Homeboy, a novel by Seth Morgan

Music 
 "Homeboy" (Eric Church song)
 Homeboys (Adam Again album), an album by band Adam Again
 "Homeboy", a song by Adorable
 "Homeboy", a song by JoJo from her self-titled album JoJo
 Home Boy, a 1985 album by trumpeter Don Cherry
"Homeboyz", a song on the album "Tupac: Resurrection"
 Homeboy Sandman, American rapper

Sports 
 Homeboyz RFC, a Kenyan Rugby Union club based in Nairobi, Kenya
 Kakamega Homeboyz F.C., a Kenyan Rugby Union club based in Kakamega, Kenya

Other uses 
 Homeboy Industries, a youth program to assist gang members
Homeboyz Interactive, an American non-profit organization

See also 

Homie (disambiguation)